Chongtar Kangri or Chongtar Peak is a mountain peak in the Xinjiang region of China.

It was first summited by Australian climber Greg Mortimer, in 1994.

See also 
Geography of China

References 

China–Pakistan border
Seven-thousanders of the Karakoram